Vassilis Mytilinaios (born 7 March 1982, in Genk, Belgium) is a Greek football goalkeeper.

He played for Akratitos, Apollon Smyrnis, Ionikos FC, Alki Larnaca, ENTHOI Lakatamia and since 2006 has played for Enosis Neon Paralimni in Cyprus.

Mytilinaios made one appearance for Apollon Smyrni F.C. during the 2002–03 Beta Ethniki season.

References

External links
Profile at insports.gr

1982 births
Living people
Greek footballers
Cypriot First Division players
ENTHOI Lakatamia FC players
Alki Larnaca FC players
Apollon Smyrnis F.C. players
Ionikos F.C. players
Enosis Neon Paralimni FC players
Association football goalkeepers
Expatriate footballers in Cyprus
Sportspeople from Genk
Footballers from Limburg (Belgium)
Greek expatriate sportspeople in Cyprus
Greek expatriate footballers